is a former Japanese football player.

Playing career
Matsuura was born in Kyoto on June 25, 1981. After playing at Júbilo Iwata youth team, he moved to Uruguayan club Peñarol in 2000. In 2001, he returned to Japan and joined J2 League club Ventforet Kofu. In 2002, he moved to Japan Football League (JFL) club Jatco. Although he played in 2 seasons, he could not play many matches and left the club end of 2003 season. After 1 year blank, he joined JFL club Denso and played many matches. From 2006, he played for Shizuoka FC (2006), Sagawa Printing (2007) and AC Nagano Parceiro (2008). He retired end of 2008 season.

Club statistics

References

External links

1981 births
Living people
Association football people from Kyoto Prefecture
Japanese footballers
J2 League players
Japan Football League players
Ventforet Kofu players
Jatco SC players
FC Kariya players
SP Kyoto FC players
AC Nagano Parceiro players
Association football defenders